This is a list of food festivals in the United Kingdom. As a criterion, established festivals should all have a devoted website to which they are linked. Some of the food festivals are alternatively entitled Show, Fayre, Fair, Fest, Feast.

A
Abergavenny Christmas Food & Drink Fair
Abergavenny Food Festival
Aberystwyth Sea2shore Food Festival
Alcester & Forest of Arden Food Festival
Alresford Watercress Festival
Anglesey Oyster & Welsh Produce Festival
Annual Whitstable Oyster Fair

B
Barnes Food Fair
BBC Good Food Show Scotland
BBC Summer Good Food Show
Beaumaris Food Festival
Big Cheese Festival, Caerphilly
Big Welsh Bite, Rhondda Heritage Park
Bishop Auckland Food Festival
Bite Food Festival, Cardiff
Black Cherry Fair
Blossomtime
Brecon Beacons Food Festival
Bridport Food Festival
Brighton & Hove Food and Drink Festival
British Food Fortnight, Across Britain
Broneirion Food Fair, Llandinam
Big Onion Food and Music Festival
Bolton Food and Drink Festival
Beaumaris Food Festivali

C
Caernarfon Food Festival
 Caerphilly Food Festival
 Cardiff International Food and Drink Festival
 Cardigan Bay Seafood Festival
 Cardigan River and Food Festival
 Cheltenham Food & Drink Festival
 Cherry and Soft Fruit Show
 Chester Food, Drink and Lifestyle Festival
 Chilli Fest
 Clovelly Herring Festival
Cowbridge Food and Drink Festival
 Gwledd Conwy Feast
Cornwall Food & Drink Festival
Clitheroe Food Festival

D
Dales Festival of Food & Drink
Dartmouth Food Festival
Derbyshire Food Festival
Devizes Food & Drink Festival
Dorset Seafood Festival
Durham City Food Festival 
Dorney Court Kitchen Garden, Eaton Dorney, Windsor
Dorlish food festival

E
East Midlands Food & Drink Festival
Eat Cambridge
EAT! Newcastle Gateshead
Elmbridge Food Festival
English Wine Week

F
The Food & Drink Festival Online
Feastival, Bridgend
Feast 2018 at Waddesdon Manor
Feast on the Bridge
Fishstock Brixham
Flavour Fest
Flavour Of Shetland
Flavours of Summer
Foodies Festival

G
Gorseinon-Swansea Food Festival
Great British Cheese Festival
 Guildford Food festival
Gwledd Conwy Feast
Gwyl Fwyd a Chrefft Portmeirion

H
Haverfordwest Beer and Cider Festival
Hay Summer Food Festival
Hay Winter Food Festival
Henley Food Festival

K
Kendal Festival of Food

L
Lampeter Food Festival
Lancashire Food Festival
Leeds Loves Food
Leicester's Summer Food and Drink Festival
Leicester's Winter Food Festival Featuring Christmas Crafts
Liverpool Food & Drink Festival
Llangollen Food Festival
Loch Lomond Food & Drink Festival
Ludlow Food Festival
Lancaster Food and Drink Festival

M
Mold Food & Drink Festival
Mortimer Country Food Fair
Malton Food Lovers Festival
Monmouthshire Food Festival
Mumbles Oyster Festival

N
Narberth Food Festival
Nantwich Food Festival
Nantwich International Cheese Show
Neath Food and Drink Festival
Newbury Food Festival
 Newcastle Emlyn Food Festival 
Newport Food Festival
Newtown Food & Drink Festival

P
Pembrokeshire Fish Week
Pershore Plum Festival
Portmeirion Food and Craft Festival 
Rye Bay Scallop Week
Porthleven Food Festival
Poole Seafood Festival

R
Richmond Fine Food and Beer festival

S
Scottish Food Fortnight
Stratford Food Festival
Spice Food Festival
St Davids Really Wild Food & Countryside Festival
St Fagans Food Festival
St Ives Food & Drink Festival

T
Taste Festivals
Tastes of Lincolnshire Christmas Food and Drink Fair
Tavistock Food and Drink Festival
The British Asparagus Festival
The Egton Bridge Gooseberry Show
The Isle of Man Food & Drink Festival
The Isle of Wight Garlic Festival
The National Forest Food & Drink Fair
The Really Wild Food and Countryside Festival
The South of England Food and Drink Festival
The World's Original Marmalade Festival
Truro Food Festival

U
Upton Food and Drink Festival

W
The Welsh Menu Live
Welsh Perry and Cider Festival
Weston super Food Festival (Weston-super-Mare)
West Wales Food Festival
Wimborne Food Festival
Wrexham Food Festival

Y
York Food Festival

See also
List of food festivals in Wales

References

Food festivals
Food

United Kingdom